Peter Cheung may refer to:

 Cheung Kwok-che (born 1951), also referred as Peter Cheung, member of the Legislative Council of Hong Kong
 Peter Cheung (judge) (born 1952), Hong Kong judge